The Library of Pantainos was a building in ancient Athens. It was located at the southeast end of the Agora of Athens, south of the Stoa of Attalus, on the left side of Panathenaion Street. It was built by the Athenian philosopher Titus Flavius Pantainos between 98 and 102 AD, during the reign of the Roman emperor Trajan. The library building was dedicated to Athena Archegetis, with Trajan himself and the people of Athens, according to an inscription on the lintel of the main entrance, which is preserved embedded in the late Roman wall,.

The monument still survives today but is in a fragmentary state. It is partially covered by the late Roman wall of the Agora and mainly by a large tower. It is one of the buildings where the study of philosophy and the cult of the Muses flourished. Destroyed in 267 A.D. during the Herulian incursion, it was incorporated in the 5th century into the great peristyle.

Architecture

The building had an unusual floor plan and structure, and is unlike any other known Roman library. The reason for the unusual floor plan was due to the irregular level of the area.

The core of the building consisted of two spaces. One was a large open courtyard measuring 20 × 13.5 m, the floor of which was paved with small irregular marble tiles embedded in mortar. The other space was a large square room, open to the east, whose floor was paved with marble slabs. Later, a peristyle was added to the courtyard, the central part of which was also paved with marble slabs. The entrance to the building was in the area directly below the site where the inscribed lintel was found. No trace remains of the internal supports of the shelves where the books would have been stored. The walls were internally lined with marble slabs, as was the floor.

The architrave on the north and west facades had Ionic columns with blue marble flutes. The masonry was not particularly elaborate.

The excavations
Excavations of the building began in 1933 and the first results appeared two years later, in 1935. The eastern part of the library building was completed in 1970.

Epigraphies
There are two inscriptions, one referring to the foundation of the library by T. Flavius Pantainos and the other to its operation.

White marble plaque - Found in the ancient Agora of Athens. The inscription recalls the rules of today's libraries. It is kept in the museum of the Stoa of Attalus.

Note: On the epigraph Β(υ)βλίον is inscribed with "υ" and not "ι" βιβλίον - Originally βύβλος means Egyptian papyrus - a name that refers to the Phoenician city Βύβλος (Present-day Lebanon) that produced the plant.

See also
 The Athenian Agora: Site Guide, Fifth Edition
 History of the American School of Classical Studies at Athens, 1939-1980

References

Ancient libraries
Libraries in Greece
Libraries in Athens
Ancient Roman buildings and structures in Greece